Brazil competed at the 2015 Parapan American Games held in Toronto, Canada.

Medalists

Archery

Athletics

Cycling

Football 7-a-side 

Brazil won the football 7-a-side tournament.

Goalball 

Brazil won the gold medal in both the men's tournament and women's tournament.
Men's group stage

Men's semifinal

Men's final

Women's group stage

Women's semifinal

Women's final

Judo

Sitting volleyball 

Brazil won the gold medal in the men's tournament and the silver medal in the women's tournament.

Swimming

Table tennis

Wheelchair basketball 

Brazil won the bronze medal in the women's tournament.

Wheelchair rugby 

Brazil lost their bronze medal match against Colombia in the wheelchair rugby tournament.

Wheelchair tennis

References 

2015 in Brazilian sport
Nations at the 2015 Parapan American Games
Brazil at the Parapan American Games